Who Killed My Daughter? is a 1992 non-fiction book by Lois Duncan detailing Duncan's search for answers in the unsolved murder of her eighteen-year-old daughter, Kaitlyn Arquette, in July 1989.

Summary
On July 16, 1989, Arquette was shot to death while coming home from a friend's house in Albuquerque, New Mexico. Duncan conducted her own investigations, which included talking to her daughter's friends, and visiting a psychic. While the police believed the shooting to be random, Duncan believes the killing was by a Vietnamese gang running an insurance fraud and drug operation in which Arquette's boyfriend was involved.

References

1992 non-fiction books
Asian-American gangs
Gangs in New Mexico
Non-fiction books about unsolved murders in the United States
Delacorte Press books